Celón is a parish in Allande, a municipality within the province and autonomous community of Asturias, in northern Spain.

The population is 117 (INE 2011).

Villages and hamlets
La Vega ("La Vega de Truelles")
Presnas
Pumar
San Martin de Beduledo ("Samartín de Beduledo")
Villaverde

References

External links
 Allande 

Parishes in Allande